Florent Dorin (born 30 December 1985 in Paris) is a French actor and musician, known primarily for his role as The Visitor in the web series The Visitor from the Future directed by François Descraques. He is also a member of the artistic collective Frenchnerd.

Background 
Florent Dorin spent his childhood shuttling back and forth between Paris and the commune of Dinan. At the age of 12, he began to make videos with his friend François Descraques and developed a taste for acting. But it was only in 2002 (at the age of 17), while shooting Les Chroniques de l'Étrange, that he considered making a career out of it.

He performed in several plays as well as in some short films, and got into the Conservatoire national supérieur d'art dramatique in 2009.

During the same period of time, he took part in various Frenchnerd projects, including the very successful web series The Visitor from the Future directed by François Descraques, from 2009 to 2014. He later joined the cast of La Théorie des balls directed by Slimane-Baptiste Berhoun and Rock Macabre directed by François Descraques.

Since then, he has kept on contributing to theater, street theater as well as other web series and short films. From 2015 to 2018, he performed in Homer's Iliad at the Théâtre de Belleville in Paris; and in Odyssey since 2017. Those two productions were directed by Pauline Bayle with Florent Dorin and other actors alternating characters irrespective of their age, gender or social rank.

He is also a musician and singer, and has released several EPs.

Filmography

Film

Web series

Television

Dubbing

Theatre

Discography 

 Florent Dorin (2009)
 Finally (2014)
 Halfway (2020)

Notes and references

External links

1985 births
French male actors
French National Academy of Dramatic Arts alumni
Living people